Bulbophyllum roxburghii is a species of orchid in the genus Bulbophyllum.

The Latin specific epithet roxburghii refers to the Scottish Botanist William Roxburgh.

References

The Bulbophyllum-Checklist
The Internet Orchid Species Photo Encyclopedia

roxburghii